Miss Teen USA 2019 was the 37th Miss Teen USA pageant. It was held at the Grand Sierra Resort in Reno, Nevada on April 28, 2019, and was hosted by Miss USA 2014 Nia Sanchez and Tim Tialdo. Hailey Colborn of Kansas crowned her successor Kaliegh Garris of Connecticut at the end of the event. This was the first time in the history of Miss Teen USA won back-to-back titles by African Americans.

The 2019 competition served as the second consecutive time that the pageant has been held concurrently with the Miss USA competition. For the first time, both the preliminary and final competitions were held on the same day.

Results

Placements

Special award

Order of Announcements

Top 15

Top 5

Historical significance
 Connecticut wins competition for the second time.
 North Dakota earns the 1st runner-up position for the second time. The last time it was placed in 2011.
 Nevada earns the 2nd runner-up position for the fourth time. The last time it was placed in 2017.
 Mississippi earns the 3rd runner-up position for the first time.
 Alabama earns the 4th runner-up position for the second time and it reaches the highest position since 2016. The last time it was placed in 1988.
 States that placed in semifinals the previous year were Illinois, Kansas, Maryland, Nevada, South Carolina and Tennessee.
 Nevada placed for the fourth consecutive year.
 Maryland placed for the third consecutive year.
 Illinois, Kansas, South Carolina and Tennessee placed for the second consecutive year.
 Oklahoma and Wyoming last placed in 2017.
 Alabama last placed in 2016.
 Arkansas and Massachusetts last placed in 2015.
 Mississippi last placed in 2014.
 Connecticut last placed in 2012 since Logan West won the Miss Teen USA title that year.
 North Dakota last placed in 2011 since Audra Mari placed the 1st runner-up of that year.
 Nebraska last placed in 2006.
 California breaks an ongoing streak of placements since 2013.
 Utah and West Virginia break an ongoing streak of placements since 2017.

Pageant

Selection of contestants
51 delegates from the 50 states and the District of Columbia were selected in state pageants held from September 2018 to January 2019.

Preliminary round
Prior to the final competition, the delegates competed the preliminary competition, which involved private interviews with the judges and a presentation show where they competed in athletic wear and evening gown. It was held on April 28 at the Grand Sierra Resort in Reno-Tahoe. For the first time since 2017, the preliminary round was broadcast.

Finals
During the final competition, the Top 15 finalists competed in athletic wear, evening gown and in a customized final question round, and the winner was decided by a panel of judges.

Broadcasting
The pageant was webcast on the pageant's Facebook and YouTube pages, as downloadable live events available on the Asian and American PlayStation Stores for PlayStation 4 consoles and on Xbox Live in 41 regions for the Xbox One line of consoles via the Facebook Video application, with support for 4K Ultra HD, Dolby Vision and HDR10 video and Dolby Atmos spatial audio.

Contestants
All 51 delegates have been confirmed:

Judges
MJ Acosta – sports broadcaster
Kristin Collin – businesswoman, music executive, and artist manager
Ivette Fernandez – businesswoman and executive
Katherine Haik – Miss Teen USA 2015 from Louisiana
Shannon Keel – general manager of the Grand Sierra Resort
Kristen Remington – news anchor,  Miss Nevada Teen USA 1999

Notes

References

External links

 Miss Teen USA official website

2019
April 2019 events in the United States
Beauty pageants in the United States
2019 beauty pageants
2019 in Nevada